AFC may stand for:

Organizations 

 Action for Children,  a UK children's charity
 AFC Enterprises, the franchisor of Popeyes Chicken and Biscuits
 Africa Finance Corporation, a pan-African multilateral development finance institution
 Agenda for Change, the current NHS pay grade system
 Alabama Forestry Commission
 Alliance of Forces of Freedom and Change, a 2019 Sudanese alliance of coalitions of political and rebel groups
 America First Committee, historical US non-interventionist group
 Army Foundation College, British future soldier training organization
 Association Française des directeurs de la photographie Cinématographique, the French Society of Cinematographers
 Australian Film Commission, Australian government's film industry promotion commission 1975–2008
 Australian Flying Corps, the forerunner of the Royal Australian Air Force
 U.S. Army Futures Command

Sports 
 Asian Football Confederation, the governing body of association football in Asia
 Aberdeen F.C., a professional association football club based in Aberdeen, Scotland
 Adelaide Football Club, a professional Australian rules football club based in Adelaide, South Australia, Australia
 AFC Ajax, a professional association football club based in Amsterdam, Netherlands
 AFC Eskilstuna, a Swedish association football club
 AFC Wimbledon, a professional association football club based in Kingston upon Thames, London, England
 Aggression Fighting Championship, formerly Aggression MMA and Armageddon Fighting Championship a Canadian mixed martial arts promotion
 Agila F.C., a professional association football club from the Philippines
 Airdrieonians F.C., a professional association football club based in Airdrie, Scotland
 American Football Conference, one of the two conferences of the National Football League originally American Football League (AFL) (gridiron football)
 AFC Championship Game, the championship game for the American Football Conference within the NFL that proceeds the Super Bowl
 Amsterdamsche FC, a professional association football club based in Amsterdam, Netherlands
 Arsenal F.C., a professional association football club based in North London, England
 Aizawl FC, a professional association football club based in Aizawl, Mizoram, India
 Australian Fighting Championship, a professional mixed martial arts promotion

Technology 

 AFC Energy, a developer of fuel cell technology
 Alkaline fuel cell, a type of fuel cell
 Application Foundation Classes, a graphical framework for building Java-based graphical user interfaces (GUIs), developed by Microsoft
 Automated Fare Collection System
 Automatic frequency control
 Abstraction-Filtration-Comparison test, a legal test to about the copyrightability of computer programs

Other uses 

 Air Force Cross (United Kingdom), a British military decoration
 Air Force Cross (United States), an American military decoration
 Antral follicle count, ovarian health statistic
 Average fixed cost, economic term

See also
 AAFC (disambiguation)